Gonatocerus ashmeadi is a species of fairyfly. Its natural range is Florida, Louisiana, northeastern Mexico, Mississippi, North Carolina, eastern Texas, and southern and central California.

It is used to control the glassy-winged sharpshooter Homalodisca vitripennis (Hemiptera: Cicadellidae)

References

Mymaridae
Insects described in 1915
Hymenoptera of North America
Biological pest control wasps